The Electric Ghosts is a collaboration between Daniel Johnston and Jack Medicine (aka Don Goede), released in 2006 on Important Records.

Don Goede (one of the original founders of Soft Skull Press) became tour manager/caretaker for Daniel Johnston in 1999, for at least 100 shows. The album is a result of songs recorded by the pair in hotel rooms before and after performances. The cover illustration is by Ron English.

Track listing
  "Sweetheart (Frito Lay)" (Johnston)
  "Goodbye to That Girl" (Johnston & Medicine)
  "Pain in My Heart" (Johnston & Medicine)
  "Summer Jazz" (Medicine/Katz)
  "Another Fucking Song About the Rain" (Medicine)
  "Row Boat (Fruit Loops)" (Johnston)
  "Blue Skies Will Haunt You From Now On" (Johnston & Medicine)
  "Scary Monsters" (Bowie)
 Hidden track

Credits
Daniel Johnston - vocals, guitar
Jack Medicine - vocals, guitar
Jade Nuss - lead guitar
Mad Francis - vocals, drums, bass, piano
Chris Bullock - Moss organ, piano
Paul Rubenstein - guitar, ubertar, mechanical monk, drums, percussion, electric saron
Tess (track 7), Kids of PS 124, Brooklyn (track 8) - backing vocals

External links
The Electric Ghosts on Myspace

2006 albums
Daniel Johnston albums
Important Records albums